Starward Rogue is a bullet hell roguelike video game from Arcen Games. The game takes place in the same universe as many of Arcen's other games, such as AI War and Stars Beyond Reach. The player controls a mech housing a severed head of an alien hydra (the main character "Hydral" from The Last Federation), shooting through the levels of a procedurally generated prison tower lodged in the surface of a star.

The game was well-received by critics and fans, being favorably compared to games like Binding of Isaac. However the positive reaction did not translate into sales, and the game's poor financial performance shortly after launch was partially responsible for Arcen laying off the majority of its staff.

References

External links
 Official Site

2016 video games
Linux games
MacOS games
Roguelike video games
Shoot 'em ups
Video games developed in the United States
Windows games